The Peebinga railway line was a railway line on the South Australian Railways network. It opened on 28 December 1914 from a junction with the Barmera line at Karoonda and ran generally eastward through the Murray Mallee terminating at Peebinga, two kilometres from the Victorian state border. It closed on 7 December 1990.

Route
The railway ran easterly from Karoonda then north-easterly, serving to open up for agriculture the lands between the Pinnaroo line which had opened in 1906 and the Barmera line which was still under construction when approval was granted for the Peebinga line.

Towns were established along the route with railway stations and schools however none of these have survived as towns.
 Nunkeri
 Yurgo
 Marama (1930 hall remains on Karoonda-Lameroo road)
 Kulkami (bulk grain silos on Karoonda-Lameroo road)
 Mulpata
 Wirha (adjacent to Billiat Road)
 Gurrai (bulk grain silos)
 Karte
 Kringin (adjacent to Peebinga Conservation Park)
 Peebinga (bulk grain silos 5 km east of Browns Well Highway)

Possible extension
Consideration was given in 1927/28 to a suggestion of extending the line from Peebinga across the state border into Victoria and northward to Morkalla to connect with what became the Victorian Railways' Morkalla line which at that time terminated at Meringur.

References

Murray Mallee
Closed railway lines in South Australia
Railway lines opened in 1914
Railway lines closed in 1990
1914 establishments in Australia
5 ft 3 in gauge railways in Australia